Los secretos de Lucía (Lucia's Secrets) is a Venezuelan telenovela produced by Venevisión in conjunction with Univision Studios and BE-TV. The telenovela is an original story from Colombian writer Jorg Hiller.

Irán Castillo and Juan Pablo Raba star as the main protagonists while Julián Gil, Maritza Bustamante and Plutarco Haza star as the main antagonists.

As of February 3, Cadenatres began broadcasting Los Secretos de Lucía at 8 pm. As of April 22, Venevisión Plus will be broadcasting Los Secretos de Lucía at 10 pm.

Plot 
In a hostile world full of violence unfolds the story of the beautiful Lucia, a woman fleeing without knowing why, because of a mysterious event that left her amnesiac, which has clouded not only her memories, but also the meaning of her life. All she knows is that she must escape from those who want to hurt her, never imagining that amid the frantic race that has become her life, she meets Miguel, a young and handsome mechanic who, impressed by the beauty of Lucia, decides to help her regardless of the consequences.
 
Love does not slow to appear and be their constant companion in the midst of the most breathtaking escape. At times, flashes of light past memories and Lucia and is terrible discoveries made, is the daughter of a vicious arms dealer and she has been involved in this business and also in countless violent deaths. So, Lucy is discovered as a criminal and that is one of its many names.
 
Be consistent with this life, be looked to question the values that feel like themselves, to sacrifice his love for Michael and move forward on a path that knows wrong. So Lucia rebels against his past and confronts him, to see if he still has time to redeem himself.
 
Lucia and Miguel raffled great difficulties along the dangerous adventure that has become their lives, adventure that will scroll through unimaginable scenarios for the common denominator, where death is always lurking, while being chased mercilessly beyond any border.
 
Will clean your sins Lucia? Is he ready to start a new life?
 
Lucia's secrets ... an exciting journey, unpredictable, surprising, looking for a new opportunity.

Cast

 Irán Castillo as Lucia Reina
 Juan Pablo Raba as Miguel Gaitan
 Maritza Bustamante as Bonny Cabello
 Julián Gil as Robert Neville
 Plutarco Haza as Arsenio Reina
 Karina Velásquez as La India
 Roberto Escobar as Antonio Jaspe
 Luis Gerónimo Abreu as Ruben Olmedo
 Sissi Fleitas as Penelope
 Yul Bürkle as Pablo Zuleta
 María Dalmazzo as Patricia Gaitan
 Aroldo Betancourt as Oficial Ernesto Cardenas
 Iván Tamayo as Jean Carlos Aguirre "La Mole"
 Mimí Lazo as Alejandra Fuentes De La Reina
 Nacho Huett as Orejas (Oswaldo Orbajan)
 Pedro A. Rodriguez as Turista
 Albi De Abreu as La Llaga
 Judith Vásquez as Josefina Castro
 Carlos Guerrero as Lennox
 Claudia Rocafort as ATF Agent Moreno

References

External links
 

Venevisión telenovelas
2013 telenovelas
Venezuelan telenovelas
Spanish-language American telenovelas
Colombian telenovelas
2014 Venezuelan television series debuts
2014 Venezuelan television series endings
2014 Colombian television series debuts
2014 Colombian television series endings
Television shows set in Caracas
Television shows set in Bogotá
Television shows set in Miami